Wang Lung Wei (born 1949), also known as Johnny Wang, is Hong Kong martial artist, actor, director, producer, and action choreographer, who has starred in over 80 kung fu films, mainly for Shaw Brothers Studios. Wang's first Shaw Brothers film role was as the traitor Ma Fu Yi in the Chang Cheh-directed film Five Shaolin Masters. This became a pattern, in that he was cast as the villain in the majority of his movies, with Martial Club being a famous exception. In 1985, Wang moved behind the camera, choreographing fight scenes, writing, and directing many movies such as Hong Kong Godfather. He retired from the industry some time before 2009.

Filmography
 Marco Polo AkA The Four Assassins (1975)
 Master of the Flying Guillotine (1976)
 Shaolin Temple (1976)
 Five Deadly Venoms (1978)
 The Avenging Eagle (1978)
 Crippled Avengers (1978)
 Vengeful Beauty (1978)
 Kid with the Golden Arm (1979)
 Dirty Ho (1979)
 Ten Tigers of Kwangtung (1979)
 Two on the Road (1980)
 Clan of the White Lotus (1980)
 Return to the 36th Chamber (1980)
 My Young Auntie (1981)
 Martial Club (1981)
 My Rebellious Son (1982)
 Health Warning (1982)
 Eight Diagram Pole Fighter (1984)

References

External links
 
 Wang Lung Wei at Hong Kong Cinemagic
 Wang Lung Wei at brns.com

1949 births
Living people
Chinese male film actors
Hong Kong male film actors
Hong Kong film directors
Hong Kong film producers
Hong Kong kung fu practitioners
Action choreographers